Matt Disher (born July 10, 1976 in Hagersville, Ontario) is a goaltender for the Edmonton Rush in the National Lacrosse League. Disher has been named NLL Player of the Week four times, defensive player of the week three times, and was named Rookie of the Month in February 1999.He was known for being the last player or goalie to wear the traditional style of field lacrosse helmet.

During the 2009 NLL season, he was named a starter to the All-Star Game.

Statistics

NLL

References

1976 births
Living people
Buffalo Bandits players
Canadian expatriate lacrosse people in the United States
Canadian lacrosse players
Edmonton Rush players
Lacrosse goaltenders
Lacrosse people from Ontario
Minnesota Swarm players
National Lacrosse League All-Stars
Portland LumberJax players
Sportspeople from Haldimand County